Emblicanins are a type of polyphenol found in Indian gooseberry (Emblica officinalis).

References 

Phenol antioxidants
Hydrolysable tannins